Carposina carcinopa is a moth in the family Carposinidae. It was described by Edward Meyrick in 1927. It is found on Samoa.

References

Carposinidae
Moths described in 1927